The Santuario della Madonna del Sangue is a sanctuary in the comune (municipality) of Re, Italy. It is devoted to the Virgin Mary and it was built where in 1494 a miracle occurred: a small fresco of the Nursing Madonna was hit by a stone and started bleeding.

This sanctuary is the destination of many pilgrimages from the area and is the most important religious place in Val Vigezzo. This church is part of the Via del Mercato, an itinerary of CoEur - In the heart of European paths.

History and description 
Only many years after the miracle, in 1627, the bishop of Novara, Carlo Bascapè, inaugurated the first sanctuary, built thanks to his initiative.

The basilica in Byzantine Revival architecture visible today was inaugurated on 5 August 1958. Designed by the architect Edoardo Collamarini, it has been built entirely by local masons and artisans and it was raised to the dignity of Minor basilica by Pope Pius XII in 1958.

See also 
 CoEur - In the heart of European paths
 Path of Saint Charles

References

External links
Sanctuary of Re

Tourist attractions in Piedmont
Churches in the province of Verbano-Cusio-Ossola
Neo-Byzantine architecture
Roman Catholic churches completed in 1956
Basilica churches in Piedmont
20th-century Roman Catholic church buildings in Italy